is a Japanese voice actor and currently active as a freelancer. He is the official Japanese voice actor for Orlando Bloom.

Career
He has done Japanese voice-overs for two of Orlando Bloom's characters, Will Turner from Pirates of the Caribbean and Kingdom Hearts II, and Legolas from The Lord of the Rings film trilogy.

Filmography

TV anime
2001
Grappler Baki: Maximum Tournament, Kohei Hatanaka

2003
Papuwa, Tōhoku Miyagi, Hayashi

2004
Gankutsuou, Baron Franz d'Épinay
BECK: Mongolian Chop Squad, Yūsuke Shīki

2005
Eyeshield 21, Hayato Akaba
Jinki: Extend, Hiroshi Kawamoto
Transformers: Cybertron, Excilion, Exgeiser
Shuffle!, Masanori Takizawa
Idaten Jump, Seiya Kanzaki

2006
School Rumble: Second Semester, Kazuya Tanaka
Otogi-Jūshi Akazukin, Hansel
Chocotto Sister, Haruma Kawagoe
Kekkaishi, Kimiya Hachiōji

2007
School Days, Makoto Ito present
The Familiar of Zero: Knight of the Twin Moons, Julio Cesare

2008
Dinosaur King, Seth present
Itazura na Kiss, Naoki Irie
Rin ~Daughters of Mnemosyne~, Teruki Maeno
Naruto Shippuden, Sora
The Familiar of Zero: Rondo of Princesses, Julio Cesare

2009
Shangri-La, Sōichirō Hata
Bleach, Senbonzakura (Zanpakutou Arc), Harunobu Ogido
Pocket Monsters Diamond & Pearl, O

2010
Omamori Himari, Yūto Amakawa present
SD Gundam Sangokuden Brave Battle Warriors, Shuuyu Hyakushiki, Reitei Gundam
Hyakka Ryōran, Yagyuu Muneakira
Detective Conan, Unpei Terado
 Highschool of the dead, Tajima

2011
Horizon in the Middle of Nowhere, Noriki, Nenji
Starry Sky, Aozora Hayato
Yu-Gi-Oh! Zexal, Charlie McCoy
Alice in the Country of Hearts, Ace
Beelzebub, Ichiro 'Alex Rodriguez' Shinjo
No. 6, Yamase
Naruto Shippuden, Sora

2012
Beelzebub, O'Donnell
Hidamari Sketch × Honeycomb, Julie
Hiiro no Kakera, Suguru Ohmi
Shirokuma Cafe, Gentoo Penguin
Space Battleship Yamato 2199, Hiroki Shinohara
Zero no Tsukaima F, Julio Cesare

2013
Brothers Conflict, Ukyo Asahina
Diabolik Lovers, Laito Sakamaki
Free! - Iwatobi Swim Club, Rei Ryugazaki
Karneval, Akari
Yu-Gi-Oh! ZEXAL II, Durbe
Alice in the Country of Hearts, Ace

2014
Ace of Diamond, Tsubasa Hirai
Aikatsu!, Shun Yotsuba
Ao Haru Ride, Yōichi Tanaka
Free! Eternal Summer, Rei Ryugazaki
Hōzuki no Reitetsu, Momotaro
JoJo's Bizarre Adventure: Stardust Crusaders (Tarot Arc), Noriaki Kakyoin
Love Stage!!, Rei Sagara
Hybrid Child, Hazuki

2015
Aldnoah.Zero 2, Harklight
Beautiful Bones: Sakurako's Investigation, Takeshi Fujioka
Dance with Devils, Shiki Natsumezaka
Diabolik Lovers: More, Blood, Laito Sakamaki
My Monster Secret, Kanade Okada
JoJo's Bizarre Adventure: Stardust Crusaders (Egypt Arc), Noriaki Kakyoin
Kamisama Kiss 2, Suiro
Log Horizon 2, Elias Hackblade
Seraph of the End: Battle in Nagoya, Shusaku Iwasaki
Star-Myu, Tsubasa Hiragi
The Testament of Sister New Devil, Kyōichi Shiba

2016
Prince of Stride: Alternative,  Shizuma Mayuzumi
Aikatsu Stars!, Hikaru Moroboshi
Ajin: Demi-Human, Kōji Tanaka
Mobile Suit Gundam: Iron-Blooded Orphans, Savarin Canule
Handa-kun, Sōichi Nagamasa
Berserk, Jerome
Nobunaga no Shinobi, Takenaka Hanbei
Magic-kyun! Renaissance, Shinra Ichijōji
Izetta: The Last Witch, Elliot
Cute High Earth Defense Club LOVE! LOVE!, Entarō Meguriya

2017
Fuuka, Hisashi
Star-Myu: High School Star Musical 2, Tsubasa Hiragi
Code:Realize ~Sousei no Himegimi~, Count Saint-Germain
The Silver Guardian, Eeyuu
Kirakira PreCure a la Mode, Elisio
Clean Freak! Aoyama-kun, Ryō Kadomatsu
Altair: A Record of Battles, Carvajal 
Is It Wrong to Try to Pick Up Girls in a Dungeon?: Sword Oratoria, Albert Waldstein

2018
Hakata Tonkotsu Ramens, Saeki
Hakyuu Houshin Engi, Taiitsu Shinjin
Aikatsu Friends!, Ken Mayuzumi
Devils' Line, Ryūnosuke Katagiri
Free! Dive to the Future, Rei Ryugazaki

2019
Domestic Girlfriend, Shū Hagiwara
Bungo Stray Dogs 3, T.J. Eckleberg
To the Abandoned Sacred Beasts, John William Bancroft (Dragon) 
The Case Files of Lord El-Melloi II: Rail Zeppelin Grace Note, Melvin Waynes
Val × Love, Tooru Inukai
Namu Amida Butsu!: Rendai Utena, Amida Nyorai
Demon Slayer: Kimetsu no Yaiba, Enmu
The Ones Within, Nanami Omejima

2020ID: Invaded, Pyrotechnician/Koji HuyukawaGreat Pretender, Thomas MeyerMr Love: Queen's Choice, Simon (Lucien)Noblesse, FrankensteinThe Gymnastics Samurai, Naohiko Nakanomori

2021I-Chu: Halfway Through the Idol, Raku WakaojiCells at Work! Code Black, Brain Cell (Command)Oshiete Hokusai!: The Animation, Kanō EitokuDragon Goes House-Hunting, White MageKingdom Season 3, KeishaPeach Boy Riverside, SumeragiPlatinum End, Metroblue

2022Eternal Boys, Kentarō Sanada

2023By the Grace of the Gods Season 2, PrenanceRevenger, LiuHelck, Mikaros

Original video animation (OVA)Hunter × Hunter: Greed Island (2003), AbenganeHunter × Hunter: G.I. Final (2004), AbenganeBoku no Pico (2006), TamotsuSchool Days: Valentine Days (2008), Makoto ItoMagical Heart Kokoro-chan (2008), Makoto ItoMegane na Kanojo (2010), Takashi MiyaguchiSaint Seiya: The Lost Canvas (2011), Aquarius DégelKono Danshi Uchuu-jin to Tatakaemasu (2012), ShiroNozoki Ana (2013), Tatsuhiko KidoHybrid Child (2014), HazukiKono Danshi, Sekika ni Nayandemasu (2014), Kouya OniharaDiabolik Lovers (2015), Laito SakamakiNoblesse (manhwa) (2016), Frankenstein

Theatrical animationThe Sky Crawlers (2008), Aizu YudagawaTiger & Bunny: The Rising (2014), Andrew Scott/Virgil DingfelderAjin Part 1: Shōdō (2015), Kōji TanakaDance with Devils: Fortuna (2017), Shiki NatsumezakaFree! -Take Your Marks- (2017), Rei RyugazakiInfini-T Force (2018)The Legend of the Galactic Heroes: Die Neue These Seiran (2019), Bernhard von SchneiderDemon Slayer: Kimetsu no Yaiba the Movie: Infinity Train (2020), EnmuFree! The Final Stroke Part 1 (2021), Rei RyugazakiBright: Samurai Soul (2021), RaidenFree! The Final Stroke Part 2 (2022), Rei Ryugazaki

Web animationMobile Suit Gundam Thunderbolt (2015), Cornelius Kaka

Video gamesAkane-sasu Sekai de Kimi to Utau (2017) - Edogawa RanpoArknights (2019) - CourierAssassin's Creed Syndicate - Jacob FryeAICHUU! - Raku WakaoujiAyakashi koi gikyoku - K-suke BlackStar - Theatre Starless - (2019), KasumiBorderlands 2, Roland (Japanese dub)Brothers Conflict: Brilliant Blue (2013), Ukyo AsahinaBrothers Conflict: Passion Pink (2012), Ukyo AsahinaCode:Realize ~Sousei no Himegimi~ (2014), Saint GermainCross Days, Makoto Ito (credited as Tatsuya Hirai)Danball Senki W, Kirito KazamaDetective Pikachu, Hiro MorganDiabolik Lovers: Haunted Dark Bridal (2012), Laito SakamakiDiabolik Lovers: More Blood (2013), Laito SakamakiDiabolik Lovers: Vandead Carnival (2014), Laito SakamakiDiabolik Lovers: Dark Fate (2015), Laito SakamakiDisgaea D2: A Brighter Darkness, XenolithGarnet Cradle (2009), Sakurazawa KiichirouHeart no Kuni no Alice ~Wonderful Wonder World, Ace-Knight of HeartHiiro no Kakera, Suguru OomiHonkai: Star Rail, Sampo KoskiIkemen Vampire (2017),  William Shakespeare Ijiwaru my Master (2008), Shirosaki HomuraJoJo's Bizarre Adventure: All Star Battle R (2022), Noriaki KakyoinJoJo's Bizarre Adventure: Eyes of Heaven (2015), Noriaki KakyoinJoJo's Bizarre Adventure: Last Survivor (2019), Noriaki KakyoinKichiku Megane (2007), Saeki KatsuyaKichiku Megane R, Saeki KatsuyaKingdom Hearts II (2005), Will TurnerKingdom Hearts 3D: Dream Drop Distance (2012), Sam FlynnThe Legend of Heroes: Trails from Zero (2010), Cao LeeThe Legend of Heroes: Trails into Reverie (2020), Rufus AlbareaThe Legend of Heroes: Trails of Cold Steel (2013), Rufus AlbareaThe Legend of Heroes: Trails of Cold Steel II (2014), Rufus Albarea / Cao LeeThe Legend of Heroes: Trails of Cold Steel III (2017), Rufus AlbareaThe Legend of Heroes: Trails of Cold Steel IV (2018), Rufus Albarea / Cao LeeThe Legend of Heroes: Trails to Azure (2011), Cao LeeThe Legend of Heroes: Kuro no Kiseki II – Crimson Sin (2022), Cao LeeLucky Dog 1, Ivan FioreMaid Hajimemashita ~Goshujin-sama no Osewa Itashimasu~, Tsuda KeiichiMr Love: Queen's Choice (2019) - Lucien / Xumo / SimonNeo Angelique (2008), Bernard Omerta ~Chinmoku no okite~, Ruka Belini
 Onmyōji (2017), Susabi
 On Air! (2018), Rei Shirayuki Otometeki Koi Kakumei Love Revo!! (2010), Takashi Sakuragawa
Period Cube ~Torikago no Amadeus~ (2016), ZainPunishing: Gray Raven (2019), ChromeSdorica (2020), Juan YunSchool Days (2005), Makoto Ito (credited as Tatsuya Hirai)Shokumonogatari, Meng Po Tang
 Shuuen no Virche -ErroR:Salvation- (2021), Lucas ProustSummer Days (2006), Makoto Ito (credited as Tatsuya Hirai)Super Robot Wars Z (2008), The Edel BernalSuper Robot Wars Z3: Tengoku-Hen (2015), AGTAISHO x ALICE, CinderellaTales of Breaker (2005), Yuteki and SauberThe King of Fighters for Girls (2019), NagiTogainu no Chi, KazuiYakuza: Like a Dragon, Sota KumeZettai Meikyuu Grimm (2010), Wilhelm Grimm

Drama CDsAi no Kotoba mo Shiranaide (2008), Shougo KajiAishiteru (Youko Fujitani) (2008), Aiha HarutomoAkanai Tobira (2008), TachibanaAlterna (Orutana) (2009), Keisuke TakeoAmbassador wa Yoru ni Sasayaku (2009), BoyerBoukun no Kajou na Aijou (2004), Makoto TooyamaCode:Realize ~Sousei no Himegimi~ as Saint-GermainDaisukes, Kurokawa DaisukeDanna Catalogue, Kanbe HitoshiDash!, AkimotoDiabolik Lovers, Sakamaki LaitoGisou Renai no Susume (2007), Maki AshiharaGoshujinsama to Inu (2008/2009), Chiharu AsadaHaiyore! Nyarko-san (2009), NyartoHanakage ~Ochita Mitsuka~, Hugh GlennHitorijime Theory (2009), NishiokaI LOVE PET! vol. 7, Shepherd Dog, SousukeSecret Eye (2009), Shirosaki HomuraIro Otoko ~Kyoudai Hen~ (2008)Jain no Chi (2007), Takaaki KadonoJooubachi no Kanbinaru Kougou, HakuouJunk!Boys (2006), Tsukasa SakumaKageki series 5: Kageki ni Tengoku, RagunoruKatekyo! (2009), Kaede SumizomeKichiku Megane Souchaku Ban (2007), Saeki KatsuyaKichiku Megane Hisouchaku Ban, Saeki KatsuyaKoi no Shizuku (2008), Reiji TakaseKonna Otoko wa Aisareru (2008), Shougo KajiKotonoha no Hana Series 2: Kotonoha no Sekai (2011), Yukitaka FujinoKoisuru Boukun, HirotoKuroi Aijou (2007), Tomonori FushimiMede Shireru Yoru no Junjou, KichouOz to Himitsu no Ai (2014), HarutoPeriod Cube (2015), ZainReload (2008)Repeat After Me? (2009), Atsushi ImaiRisou no Koibito (2013), Yoshimi KosakaSanbyaku nen no Koi no Hate (2009), HiyouSaudade (2007), Robert Blanca SerranoShukan Soine, KakeruSlaver Series, TsukuiSpirits Tea (2007), Kayama KyoheiStray Sheep (Satoshi Kagami), Seiji TachibanaTsumitsukuri na Kimi (2006), YuzukiYandere Heaven Black Series 1: Seishin Gakuen Boys Dormitory (2012), Masato NabariYuiga Dokuson na Otoko, Toshikazu OkiYuuutsu na Asa (2010/2011), Tomoyuki KatsuragiYume Miru Seiza (2008), Kuze in Yume Miru Seiza (The Constellation Shine in the Sky)/ Kensuke Yamaguchi in Saredo Utsukushiki Hibi (Beautiful Days)Ze, Himi

Dubbing
Voice-doubles
Orlando BloomBlack Hawk Down (2004 TV Tokyo edition), PFC Todd BlackburnThe Lord of the Rings: The Fellowship of the Ring, LegolasThe Lord of the Rings: The Two Towers, LegolasThe Lord of the Rings: The Return of the King, LegolasPirates of the Caribbean: The Curse of the Black Pearl, Will TurnerHaven, ShyTroy, ParisElizabethtown, Drew BaylorPirates of the Caribbean: Dead Man's Chest, Will TurnerPirates of the Caribbean: At World's End, Will TurnerThe Good Doctor, Dr. Martin E. BlakeThe Three Musketeers (2012 TV Asashi edition), Duke of BuckinghamThe Hobbit: The Desolation of Smaug, LegolasZulu, Brian EpkeenThe Hobbit: The Battle of the Five Armies, LegolasDigging for Fire, BenPirates of the Caribbean: Dead Men Tell No Tales, Will TurnerS.M.A.R.T. Chase, Danny StrattonUnlocked, Jack Alcott
Tom HiddlestonThor, LokiThe Avengers, LokiThor: The Dark World, LokiCrimson Peak, Sir Thomas SharpeHigh-Rise, Dr. Robert LaingThor: Ragnarok, LokiAvengers: Infinity War, LokiAvengers: Endgame, LokiWhat If...?, LokiLoki, LokiThe Simpsons: Welcome to the Club, Loki
Jang Keun-suk	You're Beautiful, Hwang Tae KyungMary Stayed Out All Night, Kang Mu-gyulYou're My Pet, Kang In-hoLove Rain, Seo In-ha	Pretty Man, Dokgo Ma-te
Live-action13, Vincent "Vince" Ferro (Sam Riley)Aladdin, Prince Anders (Billy Magnussen)Austin Powers in Goldmember, Austin Powers (young) (Aaron Himelstein)Before Sunset, Journalist #2 (Rodolphe Pauly)Boardwalk Empire episode "Blue Bell Boy", Rowland Smith (Nick Robinson)Bram Stoker's Dracula (15th Anniversary Edition), Jonathan Harker (Keanu Reeves)City by the Sea, Dave Simon (Anson Mount)Clash of the Titans, Eusebios (Nicholas Hoult)The Closet, Kyung-hoon (Kim Nam-gil)Cowboys & Aliens, Percy Dolarhyde (Paul Dano)The Darkest Hour, Ben (Max Minghella)The Day the Earth Stopped, Man (Bug Hall)Dawn of the Dead, Bart (Michael Barry)DOA: Dead or Alive, Ryu Hayabusa (Kane Kosugi)El tiempo entre costuras, Ignacio (Raúl Arévalo)Emily Owens, M.D., Will Collins (Justin Hartley)Euphoria, Tyler (Lukas Gage)Final Destination 2, Evan Lewis (David Paetkau)Firestorm, Goofy (Terence Yin)Flight 29 Down, Eric McGorrill (Jeremy Kissner)The Greatest Game Ever Played, Francis Ouimet (Shia LaBeouf)Ground Control (2008 DVD edition), Cruise (Robert Sean Leonard)The Grudge 2, Eason (Edison Chen)Hamlet, Guildenstern (Dechen Thurman)Hawking, Stephen Hawking (Benedict Cumberbatch)He Got Game, Lonnie (John Wallace)Herbie: Fully Loaded, Kevin (Justin Long)Hercules, Iolaus (Reece Ritchie)His Dark Materials, Lord Asriel Belacqua (James McAvoy)The Hot Zone, Dr. Peter Jahrling (Topher Grace)How to Get Away with Murder, Connor Walsh (Jack Falahee)The Human Centipede (First Sequence), Detective Voller (Peter Blankenstein)Invincible, Paul Beck (Myles Pollard)It Chapter Two, Stanley Uris (Andy Bean)JAG, Petty Officer Jason Tiner (Chuck Carrington)John Q., Mitch Quigley (Shawn Hatosy)Jupiter Ascending, Balem Abrasax (Eddie Redmayne)Killerman, Moe Diamond (Liam Hemsworth)Knight and Day, Simon Feck (Paul Dano)Labor Day, Henry Wheeler (older)/Narrator (Tobey Maguire)Lara Croft Tomb Raider: The Cradle of Life, Xien (Terence Yin)The Last Station, Valentin Fedorovich Bulgakov (James McAvoy)Leonardo, Jacopo Saltarelli (Kit Clarke)Legends of the Fall, Samuel Ludlow (Henry Thomas)Lost Boys: The Tribe, Chris Emerson (Tad Hilgenbrink)Marie Antoinette, Axel von Fersen (Jamie Dornan)My Blind Date with Life, Saliya Kahawatte (Kostja Ullmann)The O.C., Zach Stevens (Michael Cassidy)Office Killer, Brian (Eddie Malavarca)One Fine Day, Park Tae-won (Yoo Ha-joon)One Tree Hill, Nathan Scott (James Lafferty)Oslo, Terje Rød-Larsen (Andrew Scott)Outlander, Ian Murray (Steven Cree)Penny Dreadful, Dorian Gray (Reeve Carney)Phil of the Future, Phil Diffy (Ricky Ullman)The Quiet American, Joe Tunney (Robert Stanton)The Rite, Michael Kovak (Colin O'Donoghue)The Rules of Attraction, Paul Denton (Ian Somerhalder)Saw II, Daniel Matthews (Erik Knudsen)Scream 4, Charlie Walker (Rory Culkin)State of Play, Dan Foster (James McAvoy)Super Pumped, Travis Kalanick (Joseph Gordon-Levitt)Swiss Army Man, Hank Thompson (Paul Dano)T-34, Nikolay Ivushkin (Alexander Petrov)Tron: Legacy, Sam Flynn (Garrett Hedlund)Tru Calling, Harrison Davies (Shawn Reaves)Veronica Mars, Stosh "Piz" Piznarski (Chris Lowell)The Village, Finton Coin (Michael Pitt)The Villainess, Lee Joong-sang (Shin Ha-kyun)The Walk, Jean-Louis (Clément Sibony)Wall Street: Money Never Sleeps, Jacob "Jake" Moore (Shia LaBeouf)We Were Soldiers, 2nd Lieutenant Jack Geoghegan (Chris Klein)Wedding Crashers, Todd Cleary (Keir O'Donnell)Withnail and I (2014 Blu-ray and DVD editions), "...& I" (Paul McGann)X Company, Alfred Graves (Jack Laskey)

AnimationFrankenweenie, Edward FrankensteinThe Last Summoner, HuanxinPeppa Pig as NarrationThe Snow Queen 3: Fire and Ice'', Rollan

References

External links
 Official MediaForce website 
 

1973 births
Male voice actors from Niigata Prefecture
Japanese male video game actors
Japanese male voice actors
Living people
20th-century Japanese male actors
21st-century Japanese male actors
People from Niigata Prefecture
People from Niigata (city)